Tatopani is a village in Sindhupalchok District in the Bagmati Zone of central Nepal. At the time of the 1991 Nepal census it had a population of 3102 and had 613 houses in the village. Majority people are of ethnic Sherpa and Tamang. Historically and today, it is a huge trading post between Nepal and China. People living here speak Nepali and Tibetan.There is a inactive volcano in there as well. Shrestha Bipin is mayor in Tatopani. The actual border crossing is at Kodari. The village was visited by and served as pitstop for famous indian scholar and travelogue Rahul Sankrityayan multiple times on his way to Tibet.

2015 Nepal earthquake 
The village was affected by the earthquake on 25 April 2015. A joint coordination committee among all political parties in the three constituencies of the Sindhupalchok district was formed to carry out a rescue mission in the village. On 1 May, a Nepali Army rescue helicopter went 65 kilometres to Tatopani from Kathmandu to rescue 40 people.

References

Populated places in Sindhupalchowk District